General elections were held in Costa Rica on 7 February 1982. Luis Alberto Monge of the National Liberation Party won the presidential election, whilst his party also won the parliamentary election. Voter turnout was 78.6%.

Affected by a deep economic crisis and tensions with Somoza’s Nicaragua due to Rodrigo Carazo’s support of the FSLN, Carazo's government suffered from extremely low popularity. This naturally affected the Unity Coalition (Carazo's party) and its candidate Rafael Ángel Calderón Fournier giving to PLN and its candidate trade union leader and farmer Luis Alberto Monge a landslide victory and the party's biggest parliamentary group in its history (33 deputies). Nevertheless, Unity remained as the second most voted party in the election as Calderón was able to attract the traditional and very loyal Calderonista vote. The crisis was also beneficial for the Left as it achieved a historical high voting and four seats in Parliament (the biggest group since 1948) with Dr. Rodrigo Gutiérrez repeating candidacy from United People. Another candidate was former president Mario Echandi by the conservative and anti-Communist National Movement, but Echandi's candidacy was testimonial receiving almost as many votes as Gutierrez (3% each), according to some due to his incapacity to understand modern times when personal wealth and family origin was not enough to win an election.

Results

President

By province

Parliament

By province

Local governments

Ballot

References

1982 elections in Central America
1982 in Costa Rica
Elections in Costa Rica